April 26 - Eastern Orthodox Church calendar - April 28

All fixed commemorations below celebrated on May 10 by Orthodox Churches on the Old Calendar.

For April 27th, Orthodox Churches on the Old Calendar commemorate the Saints listed on April 14.

Saints

 Saint Symeon the Kinsman of the Lord, Apostle of the Seventy and Hieromartyr  (107)
 Martyr Publius (Poplion), by the sword.
 Martyr Lollion the Younger (Lollion the New).
 Saint Pollion the Reader (Pollio), of Cibalis in Pannonia, burnt alive under Diocletian (306)
 Saint Eulogius the Hospitable of Constantinople (6th century)
 Saint Nicon, abbot of the Monastery of St. Gerasimus (6th century) 
 Saint Simeon Stylites the Younger of Cilicia (597), and his brother George.
 Saint John of Cathares, Abbot of Cathares Monastery at Constantinople (839)

Pre-Schism Western saints

 Saint Liberalis of Treviso, priest from the area near Ancona in Italy who worked for the conversion of the Arians and suffered much at their hands (400)
 Saint Theophilus, Bishop of Brescia (427)
 Saint Maughold, Bishop of the Isle of Man (c. 488)
 Saint Assicus (Ascicus, Tassach), first bishop of Elphin, Ireland, converted to Christianity by Saint Patrick (490)
 Saint Tertullian, eighth Bishop of Bologna in Italy (490)
 Saint Enoder (Cynidr, Kenedr, Quidic) (6th century) 
 Saint Winewald, Abbot of Beverley in England (c. 731)
 Saint Floribert of Liège (746)

Post-Schism Orthodox saints

Saint Stephen, abbot of the Kiev Caves and Bishop of Vladimir in Volhynia (1094)
 New Hieromartyr Seraphim, Bishop of Phanarion and Neokhorion (1601)
 New Martyr Elias (Ardunis) of Mount Athos (1686)
 Saint Basil (Kishkin), Hieroschemamonk of Glinsk and Ploshchansk hermitages (1831)

New martyrs and confessors

 New Hieromartyrs Paul Svetozarov, Protopresbyter, and John Rozhdestvensky, Priest, and those with them: (1922)
 Martyrs Peter Yazykov, Nicholas Malkov, Auxentius Kalashnikov, Sergius Mefodiev and Virgin-martyr Anastasia of Shui and Palekh, at Ivanova.
 Virgin-martyr Mary Nosova (1938)
 New Hieromartyr John Spassky, priest of Tver (1941)

Other commemorations

 Incineration of the relics of Saint Sabbas, first Archbishop of Serbia, by Sinan Pasha (1595)
 Glorification (1999) of New Hieromartyr Hilarion (Troitsky), Archbishop of Verey (1929)

Icon gallery

Notes

References

Sources
 April 27/May 10. Orthodox Calendar (Pravoslavie.ru).
 May 10 / April 27. Holy Trinity Russian Orthodox Church (A parish of the Patriarchate of Moscow).
 April. Self-Ruled Antiochian Orthodox Christian Archdiocese of North America.
 April 27. OCA - The Lives of the Saints.
 April 27. Latin Saints of the Orthodox Patriarchate of Rome.
 The Roman Martyrology. Transl. by the Archbishop of Baltimore. Last Edition, According to the Copy Printed at Rome in 1914. Revised Edition, with the Imprimatur of His Eminence Cardinal Gibbons. Baltimore: John Murphy Company, 1916. p. 118.
 Rev. Richard Stanton. A Menology of England and Wales, or, Brief Memorials of the Ancient British and English Saints Arranged According to the Calendar, Together with the Martyrs of the 16th and 17th Centuries. London: Burns & Oates, 1892. p. 184.
Greek Sources
 Great Synaxaristes:  27 Απριλίου. Μέγας Συναξαριστής.
  Συναξαριστής. 27 Απριλίου. Ecclesia.gr. (H Εκκλησία της Ελλάδος).
Russian Sources
  10 мая (27 апреля). Православная Энциклопедия под редакцией Патриарха Московского и всея Руси Кирилла (электронная версия). (Orthodox Encyclopedia - Pravenc.ru).
  27 апреля (ст.ст.) 10 мая 2013 (нов. ст.) . Русская Православная Церковь Отдел внешних церковных связей. (DECR).

April in the Eastern Orthodox calendar